Aurora Botnia is a Finnish roll-on/roll-off passenger (ro-pax) ferry operated by Wasaline on the Vaasa–Umeå route. The vessel was built by Rauma Marine Constructions and entered service in August 2021.

Wasaline has advertised Aurora Botnia, which features a dual-fuel power plant capable of running on liquefied natural gas and biogas as well as a battery system, as "the world's environmentally friendly ferry".

Facilities on board

Restaurants 

 Archipelago buffet
 A la carte restaurant
 Bar and pub
 Cafeteria

Passenger lounges 

 Business Lounge
 Comfort Lounge
 Pet Lounge
 Kids' room

Meeting facilities 

 5 meeting rooms

Other 

 Shop
 68 cabins

References 

2020 ships
Ships built in Rauma, Finland
Ferries of Finland